Mount Olympus is a hill located on Upper Terrace in the Ashbury Heights neighborhood of San Francisco. It was once considered to mark the geographical center of the city, and was topped off by a statue given by Adolph Sutro, the Triumph of Light, now lost. Only the statue's pedestal remains, and the view from the top is obstructed by trees and condominiums.

References

External links
 

Hills of San Francisco
Parks in San Francisco